Ozyorsky or Ozersky (masculine), Ozyorskaya/Ozerskaya (feminine), or Ozyorskoye/Ozerskoye (neuter) may refer to:

People
Alexander Dmitrievich Ozersky (1813-1880) Russian military geologist
Joshua Ozersky (1967–2015), American food writer and historian

Places
Ozyorsky District, several districts in Russia
Ozyorsky Urban Okrug, several urban okrugs in Russia
Ozyorskoye Urban Settlement, a former municipal formation which the town of district significance of Ozyorsk in Ozyorsky District of Kaliningrad Oblast, Russia was incorporated as
Ozyorsky (rural locality) (Ozyorskaya, Ozyorskoye), several rural localities in Russia

See also
Ozyory, several inhabited localities in Russia